"Think (About It)" is a funk song recorded by Lyn Collins and released as a single on James Brown's People Records in 1972. The recording was produced by Brown (who also wrote the song) and features instrumental backing from his band The J.B.'s. It was the title track of Collins' 1972 debut album. The song is very popular for its raw drumbeat dressed with tambourine and multiple background vocals, which suggest the song was recorded altogether in one take, with Jabo Starks playing drums. It peaked at No. 9 on the Billboard Best Selling Soul Singles chart and No. 66 on the Hot 100. Owing to the composition, it became a fan favourite and has been featured on various compilation albums posthumously. In the closing lyrics, Collins sings lines from "Think", which shows that this song was one of the few adaptations of the 5 Royales song that Brown loved to do.  Think (About It) is among the most sampled songs of all-time.

Sampling
"Think (About It)" is one of the most frequently sampled songs in the history of recorded music, having been used well over three thousand times by countless hip hop and dance music artists. The song appeared on the 16th volume of the Ultimate Breaks and Beats compilation series in 1986, shortly before the release of the E-mu SP-1200 sampler in 1987. This resulted in "Think" being sampled heavily in the ensuing years. Both the song's main drumbeat and a vocal passage known as the "Woo! Yeah!" break have been used as samples. Other surrounding vocals such as the lively atmosphere of the band have been used on a loop in hip hop before, such as in the Shy FX radio edit of Wiley's "Never Be Your Woman".

Songs that sample "Think (About It)"
"Think (About It)" has been sampled in over 3000 songs; some of those songs are:
Cookie Crew - "Females" (1987)
Guy - "Teddy's Jam" (12") (1987)
Guy - "Spend the Night" (1988)
Roxanne Shante - "Go On Girl" (1988)
Rob Base & DJ E-Z Rock - "It Takes Two" (1988) 
The Real Roxanne - "Roxanne's on a Roll" (1988)
Roxanne Shante - "Bad Sister" (1989)
Roxanne Shante - "My Groove Gets Better" (1989)
Dream Warriors - "Face in the Basin"
De La Soul - "Jenifa Taught Me" (1989)
Hi-Tek 3 featuring Ya Kid K - "Spin That Wheel"
EPMD - "Gold Digger"
Wreckx-n-Effect - "Clubhead"
Bingoboys featuring Princessa, "How to Dance" (1991)
Kid Rock - "The Upside" (1990)
R.E.M. - "Radio Song"
Chubb Rock - "Ya Bad Chubbs"
Basic Black - "Nothing But a Party"
Dodge City Productions - "Ain't Going for That" (1991)
Janet Jackson - "Alright" (1990)
Janet Jackson - "Free Xone" (1997)
Carmen Electra - "Good Judy Girlfriend" (1993)
Yo Yo & Ice Cube - "The Bonnie & Clyde Theme" (1993)
Danny Byrd - "Red Mist"
Madonna - "Bye Bye Baby" (1993)
N.W.A - "Appetite for Destruction" (1991)
Today - "I Got the Feeling" (1989)
TLC - "Hat 2 Da Back"
Snoop Dogg - "Ain't No Fun"
Squarepusher - "Come On My Selector" (1997)
Afterlife - "La Nina" (1999)
Immortal Technique - "Dance with the Devil" (2001)
Styles of Beyond - "Live Enough" (2003)
Dizzee Rascal - "Pussy'ole (Old Skool)" (2007)
Kardinal Official - "Clear" (2009)
Kanye West featuring Jay-Z, Pusha T, Cyhi the Prynce, Swizz Beatz and RZA - "So Appalled" (2010)
Kanye West featuring Bon Iver - "Lost in the World" (2010)
EXID - "Ah Yeah" (Track 1) (2011)
Breach featuring Andreya Triana - “Everything You Never Had (We Had It All)” (2013)
Sigma - "Nobody to Love" (2014)
2NE1 - "I Am the Best"
Jamie xx - "Gosh" (2015)
Mr Oizo - "End of the World" (2016)
Sigala featuring Imani and DJ Fresh - Say You Do" (2016)
Fergie - "You Already Know" (2017)
Liberato - "Me staje appennenn' amò" (2018)
Sabrina Carpenter featuring Jonas Blue - "Alien" (2018)
Hælos - "End of World Party" (2019)
Porter Robinson - "Musician" (2021)
Diplo and TSHA featuring Kareen Lomax - "Let You Go" (2022)
Beyoncé - "Church Girl" (2022)

Cover versions
Reggae fusion singer Patra covered the song in 1993. Lyn Collins made an appearance on a remix, as well as appearing in its music video. 
British soul singer Beverley Knight covered the song, which was released as a B-side to her 1999 single "Made It Back 99".
DJ and producer Justin Strauss covered the song (under the alias Justin) in 1982 on Stiff Records.
Bonnie Bramlett covered this song in 1976 for her album Lady's Choice.
A 2017 recording by Barbara Tucker went to number one on the US Dance Club Songs chart.

Appearances in other media
"Think (About It)" appears on the Action 52 as an intro and Grand Theft Auto: San Andreas soundtrack on the Master Sounds 98.3 station. It is also used in two stage themes of the 1997 video game Street Fighter III: New Generation.

See also
List of number-one dance singles of 2018 (U.S.)

References

External links
 [ Song Review] from Allmusic
 List of songs that sample "Think (About It)"

1972 songs
1972 debut singles
1993 singles
Sampled drum breaks
Funk songs
James Brown songs
Lyn Collins songs
Beverley Knight songs
Barbara Tucker songs
Songs written by James Brown
Songs with feminist themes